Queen of Earth is a 2015 American psychological thriller film written, co-produced and directed by Alex Ross Perry. The film stars Elisabeth Moss, Katherine Waterston and Patrick Fugit.

Plot 
The film opens with a young woman, Catherine, in the midst of a breakup with her boyfriend, James, who is leaving her for another woman. Catherine's father, a renowned artist, has recently died by suicide after a history of depression, and in the wake of her grief, her lifelong friend Virginia invites her to spend a week at her parents' cabin to heal. Many events are intercut with scenes of Catherine's stay the previous year, when Virginia had been the one needing emotional support, and had been disappointed when Catherine brought James (who Virginia hated) instead of focusing on their friendship.

In the present day, it is Catherine's turn to be upset when Virginia invites a neighbor, Rich, to join them at the cabin. Virginia criticizes Catherine for having had unhealthy and codependent relationships with James and her father, and for choosing to live as her father's administrative support instead of attempting her own artistic career. In turn, Catherine derides Virginia for her aimless, unemployed lifestyle. Despite their arguments, Virginia assures Catherine that she truly cares about her and wants to see her heal. Catherine begins painting a portrait of Virginia as the two spend their evenings discussing their personal relationships.

Catherine's mental health gradually unravels during her stay: she has a strange encounter with a neighbor who warns her that Virginia's parents are bad people; she has difficulty sleeping and eating; and she is increasingly paranoid over Rich's presence, believing him to be driving a wedge between her and Virginia in his sexual pursuit of the latter, which an annoyed Virginia denies. As Virginia becomes concerned over Catherine's well-being, a clearly unwell Catherine worries that she and Rich believe her to be crazy. After Catherine has a disturbed reaction to Rich's observation that she had been talking to herself the night before, Virginia remarks that she is finally seeing Catherine for the first time: she had initially thought Catherine was perfect, but now realizes that she had surrounded herself with men to protect her weak and fragile sense of self. Catherine muses that she feels she no longer exists, and that the only two people who had cared about her are gone. Virginia insists that she also cares about Catherine, which Catherine casually denies.

After Virginia and Rich take Catherine out on a canoe ride, Virginia observes and then listens in as Catherine describes the event to someone on the phone. She assumes Catherine is speaking with James, but it is left ambiguous as to whether an unstable Catherine is envisioning herself conversing with her late father. That night, Virginia throws a party for some neighbors, and Catherine imagines increasingly hostile interactions with the guests, including a confrontation over her father's embezzlement, ending with her screaming as all of the guests grab at her. After coming to her senses, she flees. She begins to lose awareness of time and her surroundings, and after a dinner where Rich mocks her mental struggles and callously suggests she could use her recent grief to promote a new art career, she calmly gives Rich a disjointed but withering lecture, blaming him for being an embodiment of all the worst things in the world. 

The next morning, Catherine confronts Rich and blames him for getting in the way of what should have been her week with Virginia, but he remains unsympathetic, confessing that he hates her because he considers her a spoiled brat. Catherine ineffectually attempts to strangle him, then suffers a nervous breakdown, leading a stunned Virginia to realize that Catherine's issues are greater than her own the previous year, and she is far beyond her help. As Catherine leaves the cabin to return home, Virginia remembers the previous year, where Catherine had apologized to her for not being a better friend, and they jokingly promise that next year, Catherine can be the one needing help and Virginia can disappoint her. A guilt-ridden Virginia later discovers Catherine's finished portrait, leading her to break down in sobs as Catherine laughs manically elsewhere.

Cast 
 Elisabeth Moss as Catherine Hewitt
 Katherine Waterston as Virginia 'Ginny' Lowell
 Patrick Fugit as Rich
 Kentucker Audley as James
 Keith Poulson as Keith
 Kate Lyn Sheil as Michelle

Production 
On July 30, 2014, it was announced that Alex Ross Perry would direct the psychological thriller film which he wrote about two women at a beach house, in which Elisabeth Moss would star as lead, while Joe Swanberg would be producer. On August 21, Michelle Dockery joined the film to star as lead opposite Moss. On September 17, Katherine Waterston was added to the cast to replace Dockery for her role, which Dockery exited due to scheduling conflicts. On September 18, Patrick Fugit was cast to play a friend of one of the women in the film, who also comes to the beach to spend time with her. Perry would also produce the film along with Swanberg and Adam Piotrowicz.

Filming 
Filming was underway in Carmel, New York on September 17, 2014.

Music
The score was composed by Keegan DeWitt and was released by Waxwork Records on vinyl in 2018. The LP included liner notes by Moss, Perry, and DeWitt.

Release
The film had its world premiere at the Berlin International Film Festival on February 7, 2015.  Shortly after, it was announced IFC Films had acquired distribution rights to the film. The film was released on August 26, 2015, in a limited release and through video on demand.

Reception
, the film holds a 93% approval rating on Rotten Tomatoes, based on 81 reviews with an average rating of 7.49/10. The website's critical consensus reads: "Led by a searing performance from Elisabeth Moss, Queen of Earth is a demanding – and ultimately rewarding – addition to writer-director Alex Ross Perry's impressive filmography." On Metacritic, the film has a score of 77 out of 100, based on 23 critics, indicating "generally positive reviews".

References

External links 
 

2015 films
2015 independent films
2015 psychological thriller films
American psychological thriller films
Films directed by Alex Ross Perry
Films scored by Keegan DeWitt
Films shot in New York City
Films with screenplays by Alex Ross Perry
IFC Films films
Films shot in 16 mm film
2010s English-language films
2010s American films